Albert Edward John Spencer, 7th Earl Spencer,  (23 May 1892 – 9 June 1975), styled The Honourable Albert Spencer until 1910 and Viscount Althorp from 1910 to 1922, and known less formally as Jack Spencer, was a British peer. He was the paternal grandfather of Diana, Princess of Wales.

Early life
Lord Spencer was born in London, the son of Charles Spencer, 6th Earl Spencer, and his wife, the former Margaret Baring, second daughter of Edward Baring, 1st Baron Revelstoke. His godparents included Edward VII.

He was educated at Harrow School and Trinity College, Cambridge, where he was a friend of Lionel Lupton, who studied the same subject at Trinity. They signed up together to fight in World War I. Lupton's sister Olive Middleton was the great grandmother of Catherine Middleton who married the great-grandson of Lord Spencer, Prince William, in April 2011.

Career
On 5 August 1914, Spencer was commissioned as a second lieutenant in the 1st Regiment of Life Guards, was promoted to lieutenant on 21 October 1914, appointed an aide-de-camp on 9 May 1917, and promoted to captain on 15 June 1917. When 1st Life Guards merged with the 2nd Life Guards on 18 November 1922, Spencer was appointed a captain in the new regiment. He retired from the army on 20 September 1924, but remained a member of the Regular Army Reserve of Officers until reaching the mandatory retirement age on 2 June 1943.

On 27 August 1924, Lord Spencer was appointed the Honorary Colonel of the 4th (Territorial) Battalion, Northamptonshire Regiment, remaining in that role when it was renamed 50th (Northampton Regiment) Anti-Aircraft Battalion on 1 October 1937, and throughout its various post-war incarnations until finally relinquishing his appointment on 1 April 1967. He was awarded the Territorial Efficiency Decoration on 12 September 1944, with two clasps on 20 November 1953.

On 9 April 1935, Lord Spencer was appointed a Deputy Lieutenant of Northamptonshire, and became Lord Lieutenant of Northamptonshire on 11 March 1952, serving until 31 July 1967. He was made a knight of the Order of St. John of Jerusalem on 1 July 1955.

Lord Spencer was active in the local politics of Northamptonshire as a Conservative councillor. He opened his ancestral home, Althorp, to the public and was a well-known art connoisseur, being a trustee of the Wallace Collection and chairman of the Royal School of Needlework. He was a Fellow of both the Society of Antiquaries of London and the Royal Society of Arts, and for eight years in the 1960s he was Chair of the Advisory Council of the Victoria and Albert Museum. He was Chairman of the Governors at Wellingborough School from 1946 to 1972.

Personal life
Lord Spencer married Lady Cynthia Hamilton, second daughter of the 3rd Duke of Abercorn, on 26 February 1919 at St. James's Church in Piccadilly, London, and they had two children:

Lady Anne Spencer (4 August 1920 – 24 February 2020) married in 1944 to Captain Christopher Wake-Walker (1920–1998), son of Admiral Sir Frederic Wake-Walker, had issue.
John Spencer, 8th Earl Spencer (24 January 1924 – 29 March 1992).

Lord Spencer died at St Matthews Nursing Home, Northampton, after a short illness, and was succeeded by his son, John, the father of Diana, Princess of Wales.

Coat of arms

Ancestry

References

External links

1892 births
1975 deaths
Albert Spencer, 7th Earl Spencer
 07
Wellingborough School
Knights of the Order of St John
Deputy Lieutenants of Northamptonshire
Lord-Lieutenants of Northamptonshire
People educated at Harrow School
Alumni of Trinity College, Cambridge
British landowners
Fellows of the Society of Antiquaries of London
British Army personnel of World War I
British Life Guards officers
British Army personnel of World War II
20th-century British businesspeople
Military personnel from London